Iosif Papp-Szilágyi de Illyésfalva (13 April  1813–5 August  1873) was the Bishop of the Diocese of Oradea Mare of the Romanian Greek-Catholic Church from 1863 to 1872. He participated in the First Vatican Council.

He was born into the Szilágyi noble family.

Decorations and awards
Knight of the Order of Franz Joseph

References

1813 births
1873 deaths
People from Bihor County
Romanian Greek-Catholic bishops
Romanian Austro-Hungarians